Morten Kaufmann (born 25 March 1963) is a Danish film and TV producer. He is known for his early involvement with the Dogme 95 film movement, specifically collaborations with Thomas Vinterberg. He is based out of Copenhagen.

Filmography
 Sinan's Wedding, (1997)
 Festen, (1998)
 Fra Vesterbro til verdens ende, (1998, TV series)
 Mifune, (1999)
 Pizza King, (1999)
 Miracle, (2000)
 Kira's Reason: A Love Story, (2001)
 It's All About Love, (2003, line)
 Nordkraft, (2005, line)
 Dark Horse, (2005)
 Prague, (2006)
 A Man Comes Home, (2007)
 White Night, (2007)
 Flame & Citron, (2008)
 The Escape, (2009)
 Submarino, (2010)
 The Hunt, (2012)
 Hemmeligheden, (2012)
 Woolfert, (2013, short)
 Comeback, (2015)
 The Commune, (2016)
 Letters for Amina, (2017, executive)
 Among the Adults, (2017, short, executive)
 Word of God, (2017)
 Lila, (2018, short, executive)
 Hacker, (2019)
 Kaptajn Bimse, (2019)
 Daniel, (2019)
 My Little Dog Maestro: The Trouble with Cats, (2019, short)
 Min lille hund Mester, (2019, TV series)
 Kids on the Silk Road, (2019, TV series)
 Puls, (2020, TV series, executive)
 Shorta, (2020)

References

American film producers
1963 births
Living people